Istria may refer to:

Istria, a large peninsula in northern Adriatic Sea shared by Croatia, Slovenia and Italy
Istria County, present-day county of Croatia whose territory includes almost 90 percent of the peninsula
Slovene Istria, present-day region of Slovenia which includes northwestern portion of the peninsula 
March of Istria, a historical county located on the peninsula
183 Istria, an asteroid discovered in 1878 named after the peninsula
Istria (Milan Metro), a subway station in Milan, Italy
Istria, Constanța, a commune in Romania, located near Histria (ancient city) on the western coast of the Black Sea
Istria (river), a river in Constanța County, Romania
Istria, an IYRU 15mR racing yacht designed by Charles Ernest Nicholson and launched in 1912

See also

 Trieste (disambiguation)